The Mayor Hilarion A. Ramiro Sr. Medical Center (MHARS-MC) is a tertiary government hospital in Ozamiz, Misamis Occidental, Philippines. It is managed under the Department of Health.

Named in honor of Hilarion A. Ramiro, Sr., Ozamiz City's mayor and a physician by profession. It was during his administration that this hospital was established. His son, Hilarion Jr., who is also a doctor, became the first chief of the said hospital. Later, Hilarion Jr. became the Regional Health Director of Region XI-Zamboanga City, congressman of the Second District of Misamis Occidental, and Secretary of Health.

History 
On June 19, 1965, Republic Act No. 4225 passed into law, providing the establishment of Ozamiz City National Emergency Hospital. Dr. Hilarion J. Hilarion Ramiro, Jr., the son of then Ozamiz City Mayor Hilarion A. Ramiro Sr., was the chief of hospital. Batas Pambansa Blg. 777 enacted on April 13, 1984, changed its name to Mayor Hilarion A. Ramiro, Sr. General Hospital (MHARS GEN). It's one hundred (100) bed capacity was increased to one hundred fifty (150) on February 25, 1992, by the virtue of Republic Act. No. 7197. The one hundred fifty (150) bed capacity MHARS GEN was converted into a regional training and teaching hospital on March 1, 1995, by the virtue of Republic Act No. 7937 and became known as Mayor Hilarion A. Ramiro, Sr. Regional Training and Teaching Hospital (MHARS RTTH). Republic Act No. 10865 approved on June 23, 2016 which upgraded the status of MHARSRTTH by converting the regional training and teaching hospital to a medical center, increased its bed capacity from one hundred fifty (150) to five hundred (500), and changed its name to Mayor Hilarion A. Ramiro Sr. Medical Center (MHARS MC).  On June 24, 2021, Republic Act No. 11563 was approved which increased the bed capacity of MHARS MC from five hundred (500) to one thousand (1,000).

References

Hospitals in the Philippines